is a Japanese actress and tarento.

Biography

Career
Sato was born in Kawasaki, Kanagawa, Japan and graduated from Hiji Women Gakuen High School.

She won the 6th Japan Bishōjo Contest Grand Prize with Ryoko Yonekura in 1992. Despite sluggish in her debut, Sato co-starred in Seifuku Kojo Iinkai unit Icebox for a period of time. In 1996 she played a male character in the drama Hen.

Personality
Sato had a wide range of activities, such as presenting the Fuji Television series Unbelievable and playing a nurse in the NHK asadora Chura-san, and had the same level of popularity with the Japan Bishōjo Contest Grand Prize winner Yonekura.

Private life
Her husband Takuma Numata is an  riding instructor  He knew her when she was in a riding club, and during her 30th birthday on the 26 September 2007, Sato later announced that she married him.

Filmography

Films

TV dramas

Variety series

Informational series

Cultural series

Stage

Direct-to-video

Advertisements

Bibliography

Photo albums

Other

Awards
Hatachi no Pearl Best Dresser 1998
6th Japan Bishōjo Contest Grand Prix

References

External links
be amie profile 

Japanese idols
Japanese voice actresses
1977 births
Living people
People from Kawasaki, Kanagawa
Actresses from Kanagawa Prefecture
20th-century Japanese actresses
21st-century Japanese actresses